Taras Romanovich Bondarenko (born 23 September 1992) is a Ukrainian footballer who plays as a centre-back for Radnik Surdulica in the Serbian SuperLiga.

Career
Born in Zaporizhzhia, Bondarenko started playing in the SSSOR-Metalurh Zaporizhzhia which serves as a junior team for the FC Metalurh Zaporizhzhia franchise. He made his debut as senior playing with FC Metalurh-2 Zaporizhzhia in the 2008–09 Ukrainian Second League. Nest season he played with FC Metalurh Zaporizhzhia Reserves and Youth Team in the 2009–10 Ukrainian Premier League Reserves where he made 22 appearances. Following two seasons, between 2010 and 2012, Bondarenko played again with Metalurh-2 in the 2010–11 and 2011–12 seasons of the Ukrainian Second League where all together Bondarenko made 40 appearances and scored five goals in those two seasons.

That two last seasons were marked by unfortunate events, in the first one, 2010–11, Metalurh main team got relegated from the Ukrainian Premier League for the first time ever since Ukrainian independence. Next season, despite the fact that the main club archived its come back to Ukrainian elite, it was the reserves squad, Metalurh-2, which ended up the season relegated, thus leaving many perspective players such as Bondarenko, which Metalurh was forming for its near future to prepare for the main team, without a solid platform where to play. Eventually this meant many players left the club, among them Bondarenko as well, which joined FC Poltava. It ended up being a good move for Bondarenko since he grabbed the starting line-up spot of the main team. He played with Poltava the entire 2014–15 and the beginning of the 2015–16 Ukrainian First League, making 26 appearances in total in the league. Bondarenko also played with Poltava in the 2014–15 and 2015–16 Ukrainian Cup editions.

After a disappointing start of Poltava, Bondarenko signed with FC Avanhard Kramatorsk and played the rest of the season with them in the 2015–16 Ukrainian First League. Avanhard finished the season in the second half of the table, and Bondrenko next move was to go abroad. He joined Serbian club FK Metalac Gornji Milanovac summer camp, and after a period of trials, he got a contract. He made a debut in the 2016–17 Serbian SuperLiga as a starter in a first-round home game against FK Borac Čačak which finished with Metalac's victory of 1–0. At the end of the season, Metalac was relegated, and Bondarenko stayed with the club playing next season in second level, the Serbian First League. In summer 2018, Bondarenko joined FK Radnički Niš on a free transfer.

In February 2020 he signed a contract with FC Caspiy.

Personal life
Taras Bondarenko is son of Roman Bondarenko, a Turkmenistan international footballer.

References

External links
 

1992 births
Living people
Footballers from Zaporizhzhia
Ukrainian footballers
Ukrainian people of Turkmenistan descent
Ukrainian expatriate footballers
Association football defenders
FC Metalurh Zaporizhzhia players
FC Metalurh-2 Zaporizhzhia players
FC Poltava players
FC Kramatorsk players
FK Metalac Gornji Milanovac players
FK Radnički Niš players
FC Caspiy players
FC Okzhetpes players
FK Radnik Surdulica players
Serbian First League players
Serbian SuperLiga players
Ukrainian First League players
Kazakhstan Premier League players
Expatriate footballers in Serbia
Expatriate footballers in Kazakhstan
Ukrainian expatriate sportspeople in Serbia
Ukrainian expatriate sportspeople in Kazakhstan